Trnovec ( or ) is a village in the Municipality of Metlika in the White Carniola area of southeastern Slovenia. The entire area is part of the traditional region of Lower Carniola and is now included in the Southeast Slovenia Statistical Region.

The local church is dedicated to Saint Anthony of Padua and belongs to the Parish of Metlika. It was built in the 18th century.

References

External links
Trnovec on Geopedia

Populated places in the Municipality of Metlika